Parche is a town and Village Development Committee  in Kaski District in the Gandaki Zone of northern-central Nepal. At the time of the 1991 Nepal census it had a population of 3,182 persons living in 669 individual households.

Parche is one of 43 VDC of Kaski District lies north of Dhikur Pokhari VDC and East of Lumle VDC.Sikles is the major village of this VDC where there is traditional in-habitation of Gurung people.

References

External links
UN map of the municipalities of Kaski District

Populated places in Kaski District